Iain Coldham is an organic chemist and Professor of Organic Chemistry at the University of Sheffield. He obtained his PhD from the University of Cambridge before moving to Austin, Texas, in 1989 for postdoctoral research. His areas of study have included intramolecular trapping of episulfonium ions with amine nucleophiles and the use of triisopropylsilyl enol ethers in organic synthesis.

Academic career
 1991: Lecturer in Organic Chemistry - University of Exeter
 1998: Senior Lecturer in organic Chemistry - University of Exeter
 2003: Reader in Organic Chemistry - University of Sheffield
 2008: Professor of Organic Chemistry - University of Sheffield

Research
 Chiral organolithium chemistry
 Azomethine ylide cycloaddition
 Natural product synthesis

References

External links
 Coldham group website

Year of birth missing (living people)
Living people
Academics of the University of Exeter
Academics of the University of Sheffield
Alumni of the University of Cambridge
English chemists
Organic chemists